Toe Tag may refer to:
Toe tag, a tag typically attached to a dead person in a morgue
Toe Tag (American band), a band from Seattle, United States
Toe Tag (Estonian band), a hip hop group from Tallinn, Estonia
"Toe Tags" (CSI), an episode of CSI